Krishn Kanhai, born on 21 August 1961, is an Indian artist and painter, specialist in portrait, realistic, contemporary paintings and on lord Radha-Krishna theme paintings. A Padmshri awardee, Kanhai is described as an artist with the midas touch.

Introduction

Krishn Kanhai is a master in contemporary, portrait as well as traditional gold painting. He has, however, not confined himself to the traditional alone but has also introduced certain significant techniques of his own that makes the canvas aesthetically appealing and spiritually rich.
He started painting on folk themes while still in his teens during 1976 and gradually came to evolve a style of his own, which bore his personal stamp. It did not take much time for him to get known, as the precursor of the Yamuna Ghat painting school. Has painted thousands of portraits on the now perishing theme of Radha-Krishna and their tales. Call him a fusion artist, if you like for making beautiful use of enchanting Radha-Krishna postures and turning them into contemporary modern art, eye catching and unforgettable at once. Stand before a Kanhai portrait of Krishna and, very often, you lose the sense of time as you keep on gazing at the Lord of Vrindavan, which seems to cast a spell over the on looker. He often uses pure gold and precious gems as raw material for his paintings.
Following in the footsteps of his father and mentor Padmashri Kanhai Chitrakar who himself was a renowned Krishna and Radha artist, young Krishna was encouraged by his father to carve his own niche, which he did earlier than expected. It is seldom, if ever that a father and a son have been honoured with a national award like Padmashri.

Career

A life size portrait of Atal Bihari Vajpayee former Prime Minister of India, painted by Kanhai, hangs in the Central Hall of the Parliament at New Delhi, which was inaugurated in February 2019 by President of India, Ramnath Kovind in the presence of our Prime Minister Shri Narendra Modi and several others.
Modest to the core, Kanhai is an artist of International fame known to the political elite of the world, with several Presidents and Prime Ministers among his clients whose portraits were done by him in 2000. The list includes names like Prime Minister Atal Bihari Vajpayee and former Deputy Prime Minister of India Lal Krishna Advani, Bill & Hillary Clinton, Barack Obama and his family, besides the eminent industrialist Aditya Birla and his wife Rajshri Birla together with, one of her own kind politician, film actor and dream girl Hema Malini. For his outstanding and original contribution to the art of portraits, painting, the Government honoured him with Padmashri in 2004. He is also recipient of the National Kalidas Award 2009-10 from the Government of Madhya Pradesh as well as Yash Bharti Award from Uttar Pradesh Government (2015), and many more.
In 2016, on request from the Uttar Pradesh Government, he painted Life-size portrait of 22 Chief Ministers of UP- past and present along with 19 past and present Speakers of the UP Assembly besides two life-size portraits of Mahatma Gandhi. The paintings of the father-son duo are so highly acclaimed in the art circles of India that in 2004, 
Two research scholars, one Sangeeta Gupta of Bhimrao Ambedkar University Agra and the other Mohd. Wasim of Jiwaji Rao University, Gwalior were awarded Ph.D's on Kanhai (Father) and Krishn (Son), respectively.

Awards

 International Acclaim by Mr. A.H. Nelly (U.S.) President of International Publishers for Gold Paintings of Krishna Chitrakar on 30th Jan 1992.
 Received “Achiever of the millennium award 1999” at New Delhi.
 Brij Ratna”  by Hon’ble Shri Mohammad Hamid Ansari, Then Vice Chancellor of Alighar University.                  
 Varisht Nagrik Samman” by Distt. Magistrate Mathura.
 Hon’ble Shri A.P.J Abdul Kalam President of India president “Padmashri” on 30 June 2004 at President house New Delhi.
 Awarded “Raja Chakradhar Samman” by the Hon’ble Shri Raman Singh, Chief Minister C.G, in September 2009.
 Awarded “Rashtriya Kalidas Samman” by the Govt. of M.P. for the year 2009–10.
 Received “Paridhi Achievers Award” January 2011.
 Awarded Yash Bharti Samman by the Uttar Pradesh Government (2015)

Exhibitions

 Hotel President June, 1981, Mumbai
 Seth studio, June, 1981, Mumbai 
 Birla Academy of Art & Culture July 1981, Kolkata
 Haryana Bhawan July, 1981 Kolkata
 Special Show, Prime Minister House, 30 January 1999, New Delhi
 India Habitat Centre, February 1999, New Delhi 
 Lalit Kala Academy, November 1993 New Delhi 
 Special Show, Prime Minister House, November, 1993, New Delhi
 Birla academy of Art & Culture, September 2000 Kolkata
 Nehru Centre, Mumbai, September 2004
 Nehru Centre, Mumbai, November 2007 
 Special Show, Chief Minister House, Raipur (Chhattisgarh) September 2009 
 Raja Chakradhar samaroh, Raigarh (Chhattisgarh) September 2009
 Ravimdra Bhawan, Bhopal, M.P March 2012

International exhibitions
 Houston, Texas, U.S., August 2000 
 Hotel Holiday inn, Hong Kong, February 2002 
 Hindu Temple, Manila (Philippines), February 2002 
 Hotel Park Plaza, Westminster, London April 2015

Kanhai Art and master of traditional method of painting using gold leaves and gem stones. He was born in Vrindavan, in Mathura district in the Indian state of Uttar Pradesh. Learning the art from his father, Padmashri Shri Kanhai Chitrakar,

Krishn carry on the tradition from Kanhai Art Works, their base at Vrindavan. He is a recipient of the Achiever of the Millennium in 1999.

The Government of India honoured him in 2004, with the award of Padma Shri.  Also he was honoured with Rashriya Kalidas Award  for 2009-10 and Govt of U.P. also honoured him YASH BHARTI in 2015.

In August 2016, Kanhai made 40 portrait paintings for U.P. Vidhan Sabha, 20 portraits of all Ex Chief Minister's, 18 portraits of Vidhan Sabha Speakers and one Portrait of Mahatma Gandhi.

See also

References

Indian male painters
Recipients of the Padma Shri in arts
Living people
20th-century Indian painters
People from Mathura district
1961 births
Indian folklorists
Painters from Uttar Pradesh
20th-century Indian male artists